Rakovshchik is a surname. Notable people with the surname include:

Leonid Rakovshchik (born 1938), Soviet rower
Tatyana Rakovshchik (born 1941), Soviet rower